The Shout! Awards was an entertainment award show created to celebrate the Malaysian entertainment scene which was said (at the time) had rapidly developed. The award recognised people of music, television, film and radio industry as well as the entertainment industry as a whole.

There were 16 award categories including the biggest title - The Ultimate Shout! Award. The nominees were voted by the public online except for the Ultimate Shout! Award where it was decided by the judges.

Shout! Awards 2009
The first ever Shout! Awards was held on 17 July 2009 and was aired live on 8TV. The voting started from 8 June and ended on 16 July 2009.

Nominees and winners 
Winners are highlighted in bold.

Ultimate Shout! Award
 Bunkface

Music
 Rockstar Award (Rock Awards)
 Bunkface
 Butterfingers
 Estranged (band)
 Hujan
 Meet Uncle Hussain
 Pop Shuvit
 Popstar Award (Pop Awards)
 Aizat
 Couple
 Siti Nurhaliza
 Jaclyn Victor
 Nikki
 Stacy
 Power Vocal Award (Powerful Vocals Awards)
 Ayu
 Dato’ Siti Nurhaliza
 Dina
 Jaclyn Victor
 Lan (Meet Uncle Hussain)
 Syarul Reza (Love Me Butch)
 Flava Award (Hip Hop / R&B Awards)
 Ahli Fiqir
 Caprice
 Jin Hackman
 Joe Flizzow
 Malique
 Phlowtron
 Break Out Award (Best New Act)
 Bunkface
 Hujan
 Joe Flizzow
 Malique
 Meet Uncle Hussain
 Pesawat

Television and Film
 Best On Screen Chemistry
 Cheryl Samad & Nazrudin Rahman (‘Ghost’)
 Syafinaz Selamat & Paul Moss (OIAM2)
 Vanidah Imran & Afdlin Shauki (‘Sepi’)
 Zahiril Adzim & Liyana Jasmay (‘KAMI’)
 Upin Dan Ipin (‘Upin & Ipin’ – TV series)
 Fresh TV Series Award (New TV Series including Dramas and / or Sitcoms)
 Field Trip! USA
 Frontpage
 Ghost
 Kekasihku Seru
 Sindarela
 Breakthrough Film Award
 Budak Kelantan @ Kelantan Boys
 Kala Malam Bulan Mengambang
 KAMI
 Los Dan Faun
 Sepi
 Favorite TV Program (Non Drama)
 Destinasi Bajet (Season 2)
 Field Trip! USA
 Homegrown (Season 3)
 Majalah 3
 OIAM 2
 Favorite TV Host
 Daphne Iking ('The Breakfast Show’)
 Marion Caunter (OIAM2)
 Nazrudin Rahman (‘The Breakfast Show’)
 Qushairi aka Qi (‘Destinasi Bajet Season 2’)
 Qushairi aka Qi (‘Field Trip! USA’)

Radio
 Coolest Radio Announcer
 Fara Fauzana
 Hunny Madu
 JJ
 Phat Fabes
 Rudy
 Favorite Radio Show
 Fly FM Must Have Music (Hunny Madu)
 Fly FM Night Flight (Basil & Hafiz)
 Fly FM Pagi Show (Ben, Nadia & Phat Fabes)
 Hot FM AM Show (Fara Fauzana & Faizal Ismail)
 Indie X (Smek & Mat)

The Works
 Stylo Award (Most Stylish Awards)
 Dynas Mokhtar
 Faizal Tahir
 Marion Caunter
 Maya Karin
 Sazzy Falak
 Hot Chick Award
 Andrea Fonseka
 Daphne Iking
 Fazura
 Marion Caunter
 Marsha
 Hot Guy Award
 Faizal Tahir
 Jonathan Putra (JP)
 Tony Eusoff
 Zahiril Adzim
 Zizan Nin

Shout! Awards 2010
The second edition of Shout! Awards was held on 20 November 2010 at Putra Stadium, Bukit Jalil, Kuala Lumpur. Like the previous year, the award was aired live on 8TV. The voting session started on 18 October 2010 and ended on 20 November 2010. Xpax, Celcom's brand for prepaid mobile services which is also a sponsor for the edition, also introduced a new award called Mobile Artist of The Year Award.

During that night, then-newcomer singer-songwriter, Yuna was awarded the Ultimate Shout! Award, an award given to the artist who had created a scene or phenomena in the entertainment industries. The award was presented to her by the 2009's recipient, Bunkface.

Besides being awarded with the highest recognition, Yuna also won another two awards, Popstar Award (Pop Award) as well as Break Out Award (Best New Act); making her the biggest winner on that night with three awards in total. She was then followed by local indie band, Bunkface who picked up two awards; Rockstar Award (Rock Award) and Music Video Award (Best Music Video) for 'Prom Queen'.

Nominees and winners 
Winners are highlighted in bold.

Ultimate Shout! Award
 Yuna

Music
 Rockstar Award (Rock Awards)
 Azlan & the Typewriter
 Bunkface
 Faizal Tahir
 Hujan
 Meet Uncle Hussain
 Pop Shuvit
 Popstar Award (Pop Awards)
 Aizat
 Dato' Siti Nurhaliza & Krisdayanti
 Jaclyn Victor
 Mizz Nina
 Yuna
 Zee Avi
 Power Vocal Award (Powerful Vocals Awards)
 Azlan & the Typewriter
 Black
 Dato' Siti Nurhaliza & Krisdayanti
 Faizal Tahir
 Jaclyn Victor
 Rithan (Deja VooDoo Spells)
 Flava Award (Hip Hop / R&B Awards)
 Altimet
 DJ Fuzz & Malique
 Joe Flizzow
 Malique
 Mizz Nina
 Sonaone
 Music Video Award (Best Music Video)
 'Prom Queen by Bunkface Osaka by Disagree
 Do It, Duit by Joe Flizzow
 Mirage by Pesawat
 Marabahaya by Project E.A.R
 Cinta Kosmik by The Fabulous Cats
 Break Out Award (Best New Act) Azlan & The Typewriter
 Black
 Mizz Nina
 Monoloque
 Yuna Zee Avi
 Mobile Artist of the Year Award Khatimah Cinta by 6ixth Sense Menatap Matamu (Chorus) by Aril
 Tinggal Kenangan by Saleem
 Dan Sebenarnya (WkndSessions) by Yuna
 Cukup Indah by Alif Satar

Television and Film
 Best On Screen Chemistry Afdlin Shauki & Liyana Jasmay (Papadom) Upin & Ipin (Upin & Ipin)
 Remy Ishak & Tiz Zaqyah (Nur Kasih)
 Farid Kamil & Lisa Surihani (Lagenda Budak Setan)
 Wakakaka Crew & Giler Battle Crew (Showdown 2010)
 Afdlin Shauki & Rashidi Ishak (Setem)
 Fresh TV Series Award (New TV Series including Dramas and / or Sitcoms) Adamaya
 Arjuna
 Blogger Boy
 Gelora Di Hati Sara
 Nur Kasih Qalesya
 Breakthrough Feature Award Cuci The Musical
 Geng : Pengembaraan Bermula
 Lagenda Budak Setan Papadom
 Pisau Cukur
 Setem
 Favorite TV Program (Non Drama) Imam Muda
 One In A Million Year 3
 Melodi
 Raja Lawak 4
 Anugerah Juara Lagu 24
 Showdown 2010 Favorite TV Personality Award Ally Iskandar (Anugerah Juara Lagu 24)
 Awal Ashaari (Fuhhh!)
 Aznil Haji Nawawi (Jangan Lupa Lirik)
 Daphne Iking (The Breakfast Show)
 Henry Golding (The Quickie)
 Zizan Raja Lawak (Raja Lawak 4)Radio
 Coolest Radio Announcer Award Faizal Ismail (HotFM AM Krew)
 Hafiz Hatim (FlyFM's Night Flight)
 Jeremy Teo (RedFM Evenings)
 Hunny Madu (FlyFM Campur Chart)
 Fara Fauzana (HotFM AM Krew)
 Phat Fabes (FlyFM Pagi Show) Favorite Radio Show Award Malaysia's Hottest Music ~ 10@10 (Hunny Madu)
 FlyFM Pagi Show (Phabes, Ben & Nadia)
 The Red FM Breakfast Show with JD & Dilly (JD & Dilly)
 FlyFM Campur Chart (Hunny Madu)
 HotFM AM Krew (Fara Fauzana, Faizal Ismail & AG) FlyFM's Rush Hour (Jules & Prem)

The Works
 Hot Chick Award Maya Karin
 Mizz Nina
 Nora Danish
 Nur Fazura
 Scha Alyahya Vanidah Imran
 Hot Guy Award Faizal Tahir
 Farid Kamil
 Hans Isaac
 Henry Golding (8TV Quickie) Remy Ishak
 Shaheizy Sam

 Shout! Awards 2012 
The third and last known edition of Shout! Awards was held on 23 November 2012 at the Surf Beach at Sunway Lagoon, Bandar Sunway, Petaling Jaya, Selangor. The original date was 24 November 2012; the new date was made in September 2012. This is the first time Shout Awards was held in an open place Nominees for the edition was announced on 19 October 2012 while the votings was started on 22 October 2012. The edition was aired live on 8TV and repeated the next day on TV9 at 10:30 pm.

The edition introduced two new awards, both of them are related to social media and placed in the Social Media category. The Shout! Aloud Award is given to Malaysians who contribute content to the social media such as vlogs while the Wired Celebrity Award is given to Malaysian celebrities who have become popular through the social media.

 Nominees and winners 
Winners are highlighted in bold.

Ultimate Shout! Award
 KRUMusic
 Rockstar Award (Rock Awards) Bunkface Estranged
 Faizal Tahir
 Hujan
 Love Me Butch
 Monoloque
 Popstar Award (Pop Awards) Aizat
 Dato' Siti Nurhaliza
 Hafiz
 Jaclyn Victor
 Najwa
 Yuna Power Vocal Award (Powerful Vocals Awards) Azlan & the Typewriter
 Black
 Faizal Tahir
 Jaclyn Victor
 Shila Amzah Yuna
 Flava Award (Hip Hop / R&B Awards) Altimet, Joe Flizzow and Sonaone
 Black ft Malique Malique ft Jamal Abdillah
 Malique and Rabbani
 Mizz Nina
 Zizan and Kaka
 Break Out Award (Best New Act) Diandra Arjunaidi
 Go Gerila!
 Kyoto Protocol
 Massacre Conspiracy Najwa
 Oh! Chentaku
 Music Video Award (Best Music Video) With You by Mizz Nina Got to Go by Najwa
 Carilah Duit by One Buck Short
 Deja Vu by Shila Amzah
 Livin' Rock and Roll by The Azenders
 Terukir di Bintang by Yuna

Television and Film
 Best On Screen Chemistry Awie, Johan and Usop Wilcha (SHY8) (Hantu Kak Limah Balik Rumah)
 Zizan Razak and Aaron Aziz (KL Gangster)
 Remy Ishak and Tiz Zaqyah (Nur Kasih The Movie)
 Aaron Aziz and Maya Karin (Ombak Rindu)
 Josiah Hogan and Iedil Putra (Projek Pop)
 Johan and Zizan Razak (Raja Lawak Musim 6) Fresh TV Series Award (New TV Series including Dramas and / or Sitcoms) Betul Ke Bohong?
 Friday I'm In Love
 Projek Pop
 Tentang Dhia
 Versus Yuna - Bintang Di Langit
 Favorite TV Program (Non Drama) Anugerah Juara Lagu Ke-26
 Karoot Komedia X (Raya)
 Maharaja Lawak Mega (Final)
 Showdown 2012 Super Spontan
 Versus - Konfrontasi Terakhir
 Breakthrough Local Feature Award Bunohan
 Hantu Kak Limah Balik Rumah
 Hikayat Merong Mahawangsa
 Nur Kasih The Movie
 Ombak Rindu
 Songlap Favorite TV Personality Award Adibah Noor (Super Spontan)
 Hafiz Hatim (Showdown 2012)
 Henry Golding (Welcome To The Rail World)
 Johan (Raja Lawak 6)
 Razif Hashim (Best In The World)
 Zizan Razak (Raja Lawak 6)Radio
 Coolest Radio Announcer Award Faizal Ismail (HotFM AM Krew)
 Fara Fauzana (HotFM AM Krew)
 Hafiz Hatim (FlyFM's Pagi Rock Crew)
 Hunny Madu (FlyFM Malaysia's Hottest Music) Nabil Ahmad (Suria FM's Ceria Pagi di Suria)
 Phat Fabes (FlyFM's The Phat Fabes and Ben Show)
 Favorite Radio Show Award 33RPM
 Dansa Era Bersama Nazpoleon, G dan DJ Fuzz
 Fly FM Stripped
 Fly FM Pagi Rock Crew
 Fly FM The Phat Fabes & Ben Show
 Top 5 Panggilan Hangit-Fara, AG, FBIThe Works
 Hot Guy Award Aaron Aziz Hans Isaac
 Henry Golding
 Remy Ishak
 Shaheizy Sam
 Zizan Razak
 Hot Chick Award Nur Fazura
 Lisa Surihani
 Marion Rose Counter
 Maya Karin
 Nora Danish Scha Alyahya

Social media
 Shout! Aloud Award Faradyable
 IniAnwarHadi
 JinnyboyTV
 Matluthfi90 Popteevee
 The WKND
 Wired Celebrity Award AG Coco
 Altimet
 Celepets
 Fatimah Abu Bakar
 Sofia Jane
 Yuna'''

References

External links
 Shout! Awards official website

Shout! Awards
Television awards
Television in Malaysia